The Trinity Foundation is an American watchdog ministry founded by Ole Anthony in 1972. Its main mission is to expose abuse of public trust by teleevangelists and religious organisations. It has provided information to news outlets as well as state and federal agencies.  the president of the organization is Pete Evans.

It launched the Dallas Project in the 1980s as a challenge to religious organizations to help the homeless in the United States, which was in 2010 taken over by Community on Columbia (The Block), a church attended by many members of Trinity Foundation.

History
The Trinity Foundation was founded by Ole Anthony in June 1972. and based in Dallas, Texas.

The organization started with the purpose of conducting demographic research on televangelism and other religious television programming. During a series of scandals in the 1980s and 1990s, the Trinity Foundation established itself as a watchdog group which provided information about fraud and abuse by religious groups.

It has provided the results of its research and collaborated with journalists at ABC News, CBS News, NBC News, CNN, and Last Week Tonight with John Oliver. 

Anthony died in 2021.

Televangelists

Trinity Foundation's investigative work into the fundraising tactics of big-money televangelists first came to national attention in 1991 following a Primetime Live hidden-camera look at televangelist Robert Tilton. The foundation was instrumental in providing evidence for the many state and federal investigations of Tilton in the years that followed.

Other televangelists investigated by Trinity include Benny Hinn, Jan and Paul Crouch Kenneth Copeland, Joyce Meyer, Paula White, Peter Popoff, W.V. Grant, and Edwin Barry Young. It has been a critic of the Trinity Broadcasting Network, and called for ministries of prominent tele-evangelists Billy and Franklin Graham, Charles Stanley, Ron Luce, and others to withdraw from the network.

Regarding Benny Hinn, Trinity claimed to have evidence showing that his ministry does not qualify as a church under Internal Revenue Service guidelines, as reported by The Dallas Morning News in July 2005.  Specifically, Trinity claims that Hinn's ministry did not hold regular public worship services at its facility, as access is strictly limited to employees with access badges.

Senate Finance Committee investigation

The foundation was directly involved in Sen. Charles Grassley's Senate Finance Committee investigation of abuses by a number of televangelist ministries. Beginning in 2005, after being asked to help by the committee’s general counsel,  the foundation submitted over the next six years 38 separate reports on abuses by religious not-for-profit organizations, which were incorporated into the committee’s final report.

The foundation criticized  Grassley for turning to the Evangelical Council for Financial Accountability (ECFA) for suggested solutions instead of acting on tough legislative proposals from his staff for policing abuses by religious organizations. It said that the ECFA's recommendations were too lax and were compromised by close ties to the very ministries they were proposing to oversee.

Other investigations
Trinity has also investigated the St. Matthew's Churches/Church By Mail, Inc., a "seed-faith ministry" of James Eugene "Gene" Ewing, which targets the poorest zip codes in America with religious mailings.

An investigative report on the Australian ABC TV's 7.30 programme on 6 April 2022 revealed that Hillsong, the global megachurch headquartered in Sydney, had acquired a lot of property that had been hidden behind a web of entities across the world. It had done this in part by assuming financial control over other churches, starting with Garden City Church in Brisbane in 2009. The Trinity investigator, Barry Bowen, found that Hillsong owned at least three condominiums in New York City, a US$3.5-million home in California and 31 properties in Arizona, expected to be worth a total of US$40 million by 2023. Its corporate and financial structures mean that the church is protected against litigation which demands large payouts to plaintiffs.

Other activities
The foundation published The Wittenburg Door, a magazine of Christian satire that was established in 1971, from 1995 to 2008.

It launched the Dallas Project in the 1980s as a challenge to religious organizations to help the homeless in the United States, which was in 2010 taken over by Community on Columbia (The Block), a church attended by many members of Trinity Foundation. This is an independent church congregation separate from the foundation's oversight, but still in friendly cooperation and agreement with its mission.

Controversy
Some former members of the group have been critical of the foundation and Anthony, accusing it of abuse and cultism.

Footnotes

References

External links 
 
 Radio interview with Ole Anthony - Pilgrim Radio Network - interview by Bill Feltner, November 2012.
 God Doesn't Need Ole Anthony--The Antichrist of East Dallas: The man televangelists hate (Reprinted from The New Yorker, Dec. 6, 2004).
  - Excerpt from a documentary on The Wittenburg Door, 5 October 2008.

Organizations based in Dallas
Foundations based in the United States
1972 establishments in Texas
Cults